Bernard Oliver Satenstein (c. 1906 – May 1, 1959) was an American football player who five seasons in the National Football League with the Staten Island Stapletons and New York Giants. He played college football at New York University and attended Cushing Academy in Ashburnham, Massachusetts. He was also a coach at Mount Vernon High School in Mount Vernon, New York. Satenstein died as a result of a heart attack.

References

External links
Just Sports Stats

1900s births
1959 deaths
Players of American football from Massachusetts
American football guards
American football ends
American football tackles
American football centers
NYU Violets football players
Staten Island Stapletons players
New York Giants players
People from Ashburnham, Massachusetts
Sportspeople from Worcester County, Massachusetts